Team Kiwi Racing is a racing team that previously competed in the Australian V8 Supercar series, the Australian Carrera Cup Series, The New Zealand 2.0ltr Touring Car Championship, The NZV8 Championship and BMW Championship Series. The team has since returned at much reduced scale, competing in one make series' in New Zealand while also supporting a number of up and coming young Kiwi drivers from grass root level motorsport through to domestic and international competition.

Although the majority of races in the V8 Supercar series are run in Australia, Team Kiwi Racing was the only team to be headquartered in New Zealand. Their offices are in Auckland, New Zealand while the team rented space to base their Supercar team out of workshops in both Queensland and Victoria, depending on which team they were aligning with for that coming season. When racing a Ford the team based in Victoria and when racing a Holden the team based in Queensland. For much of the second half of their V8 Supercar tenure the team formed a strategic alliances with PMM in Queensland and multi car team FPR in Melbourne in an attempt to improve on track results via multi car partnerships.

The ability of the team to operate became clouded after bankruptcy proceedings where incorrectly placed against Sole Team Owner, David John in New Zealand. The Bankruptcy proceedings were quickly annulled highlighting the news information circulating and initial bankruptcy proceedings may not have been 100% correctly applied. The annulment means David John was effectively never bankrupted but damage had been done to Mr John.

Despite this and all the time and focus that goes with having to defending himself as above, Mr John and the team attended the 2009 pre-season test at Queensland Raceway in preparation for another full season in the Supercars Championship. N John's bankruptcy was later annulled in November 2009 - 

In 2009, after the second round in Hamilton, New Zealand; the team's REC was bought out by driver, Dean Fiore and a new team established named Triple F Racing ending TKR's involvement in V8 Supercar.

History
Team Kiwi Racing is a New Zealand-based motorsport team that has achieved plenty as a team and for Kiwi drivers since their debut in 1999, both on the domestic New Zealand and International Motorsport stages. Debuting in 1999 with a two car team in the New Zealand 2.0L Touring Car championship, Team Kiwi Racing built two P11 Nissan Primera's to take on the BMW Factory backed team that had dominated the New Zealand 2.0L Touring Car Championship for many years. TKR Owner David John secured the services of Jason Richards and Angus Fogg as the selected drivers for the team and each driver was also employed as full-time staff. Richards helped with the promotions and marketing while Fogg was in charge of building the team's Nissan Primera race cars. Team Kiwi Racing announced their arrival in style on debut in the New Zealand 2.0L Touring Car Championship with the TKR Nissan Primera's taking home first position (Jason Richards) and second position (Angus Fogg) in the championship ending the dominance of the factory BMW team. Team Kiwi Racing went on to achieve back to back championship titles in 2000 with Jason Richards winning the 2.0L Touring Car Championship again for TKR while Angus Fogg came home in third place.

In 2000 Team Kiwi Racing owner David John honoured his commitment to Jason Richards and Angus Fogg and made the significant step from domestic to international competition. Debuting at Bathurst in November 2000 as the first ever New Zealand based V8 Supercar team to compete in the Australian V8 Supercar Championship, numbered #777, the car finished 16th at Bathurst, despite the race being run in driving rain. TKR used Holden vehicles as their choice of race cars until the end of the 2006 season. TKR did run a two car team at the Adelaide round and the event at Pukekohe in the 2001 V8 Supercar Championship for lead driver Jason Richards and for fellow Kiwi Angus Fogg, before deciding to focus on a single car team moving forward for Jason Richards midway through 2001.

TKR punched well above their weight as part of the Australian V8 Supercar Championship, as a privateer team that did not enjoy the benefits of factory support. TKR achieved a Pole Position at the 2004 Winton event in very trying conditions then achieved a podium in the 2005 Shanghai round, finishing third for the round. TKR finished 6th in Perth after leading the entire race from start to within 100m of the finish line where Radisich was spun around coming onto the front straight while leading. A top 8 position finish at Bathurst, 3rd in race 2 in Canberra and a number of other top ten results and not worthy drives. Throughout their existence the team only failed to qualify for an event once.

During the 2006 Bathurst 1000 endurance race at Mount Panorama, driver Paul Radisich crashed at around 200 km/h head on into a tyre barrier, flipping the car on the roof. The roof had to be cut off to get Radisich out and he was taken to hospital where he was in a serious but stable condition. The car was so badly damaged that the team was unable to race at the following Indy 300 round on the Gold Coast. The team leased the chassis from Paul Morris Motorsport used earlier in the season to replace the damaged car for the remainder of the season, with former driver Craig Baird and young NZ driver Chris Pither driving the car at the Tasmania & Bahrain rounds respectively. The car was then driven by Fujitsu V8 driver Tony Evangelou for the final round at Phillip Island.

For the 2007 season, TKR, Ford Performance Racing and Prodrive Australia entered discussions that would see TKR buy an FPR Falcon with technical support from FPR. Despite many thinking this was a factory backed deal with support from Ford NZ and Ford Australia, this was not the case. TKR was grouped with FPR due to their technical partnership, reducing TKR's available test days. Radisich was retained as the lead driver, although he missed the season opening Clipsal 500 as his recovery from the Bathurst accident continued. In May 2007 a dispute between Radisich, TKR and FPR broke out. Radisich accused TKR of breaching its contract with FPR and went out to the media with a statement saying in some way TKR had breached their contact with Radisich, despite Radisich being contracted to TKR not FPR in any manner, way, shape or form and even before TKR and FPR had officially parted ways or what plans TKR has in place.

TKR sold the ex FPR car back to FPR and contrary to what was said in the press FPR was not left out of pocket one cent. Needless to say TKR and Radisich parted company seeing Radisich out of a drive.

After missing Eastern Creek, Hidden Valley Raceway and Queensland Raceway allowing time for the preparation of a new car and engines to be completed it was announced that TKR had struck a deal with fellow Ford team Stone Brothers Racing. New Zealand Rookie Shane van Gisbergen was announced as the TKR driver to replace Radisich.

Van Gisbergen went on to prove himself as a talented young Kiwi driver with plenty of potential so much so that Stone Brothers Racing fast tracked van Gisbergen in to their team after only completing his first season with TKR.

Looking to continue with the opportunity that Team Kiwi Racing was established in the first place to provide Kiwi drivers support with establishing themselves in the Australian V8 Supercar Championship, it was announced that in 2008 Kayne Scott would drive for TKR. Scott drove eight rounds and the team rotated the car through a number of drivers such as Chris Pither, Steve Owen, Daniel Gaunt and for special promotional purposes to provide V8 Supercars additional media exposure throughout the UAE, Team Kiwi Racing provided Bahrain domestic series driver Fahad Al Musalam with the opportunity to drive the TKR V8 Supercar at the Bahrain round of the V8 Supercar Championship.

With the team struggling to get on-top of the ex888 Ford Falcon throughout the 2008 season, TKR decided that after a discussion with Paul Morris it would be better for TKR to go back to what they knew, having already purchased two PMM V8 Supercar previously.

In 2009 TKR provided the drive to former Carrera Cup racer Dean Fiore who was in a position to bring sponsors to the team and could help TKR get back on track without TKR having to fund all of the seasons running budgets as they had done for most TKR drivers over the previous years.

In 2009 around the time of the global melt down the ANZ bank in New Zealand called in a bank overdraft facility to be repaid by Team Kiwi Racing Owner David John personally. Mr John had signed as a guarantor for a $300,000 overdraft facility for Team Kiwi Racing to get the team back on track with new cars engines etc. after the 2007 Radisich crash and the 2008 Pither Bathurst crash that hurt the team close to $750,000 of repairs and replacement of car costs.

Despite Mr John explaining to ANZ bank that despite ample assets to cover the loan, that the race season had started and that he need the bank to work with him and wait till years end (7 months) as all assets he could sell off to repay the loan were required for the race team to operate such as cars, engines, trucks, transporters, V8 Supercar Franchise, merchandise etc. which were all worth well over A$3,000,000, the ANZ bank refused to wait and proceed with bankruptcy proceedings against Mr John personally. Ironically Mr John's bankruptcy was annulled with-in weeks of the bankruptcy with not one person left out of pocket or no annulment would have been provided.

Despite keeping V8 Supercars up dated on all of the above, V8 Supercars seized TKR's Racing Entitlement Contract after the Hamilton round of the Championship in order that it would be sold and or leased. Interesting the TKR franchise was sold by V8 Supercars to the very same team that Mr John had already contracted as driver for TKR in 2009 season being Dean Fiore and the same family Mr John had been in discussions with himself before V8 Supercars stepped in. The Fiore family used the franchise to start Triple F Racing.

Despite this Team Kiwi Racing has focussed on the support and development of young up and coming Kiwi drivers. In 2009 Team Kiwi Racing (TKR) secured 2 x BMW Minis to run in the New Zealand BMW Mini Challenge Championship for Matt Hamilton and Ryan Bailey. Both TKR BMW mini's dominated the BMW Mini Challenge Championship with Matthew Hamilton taking out first position and Ryan Bailey taking out second position for a TKR one two in the Championship.

As a reward Team Kiwi Racing ran Hamilton in the 2010 Fujitsu V8 Supercar Series in Australia, but only for the first three rounds.

Not content with a one two in the 2009/10 Championship TKR purchased a third BMW Mini Challenge racecar for the 2010/11 Championship season. This saw Ben, Matthew Gibson and Craig Innes selected to drive the TKR car this season. And what a season it was with the TKR not only winning back to back Championship titles but TKR also took out second and third position for a clean sweep of the podium at years end. 1st was Ben Dallas, 2nd Craig Innes and third was Matthew Gibson rounding out the TKR clean sweep.

For 2012 TKR provided Andre Heimgartner with a full season in the TKR Porsche Carrera Cup car in the Australian Porsche Carrera Cup Championship. TKR provided expert input to Heimgartner with driver advise from Porsche Carrera Cup legend Craig Baird and Porsche Technical Engineer Todd Bickerton who was contracted to TKR for the season.

Along with a number of solid results during his debut season Heimgartner was awarded Rookie of the year at the final round of the Australian Porsche Carrera Cup Championship held at the Gold Coast Indy 300 event. This saw Heimgartner provided with the opportunity to be fly over to Europe to test against other top rookies from around the world for one seat in the Porsche Super Cup Championship that is partly funded by Porsche Germany. Heimgartner missed out on the drive but again TKR had helped a young kiwi driver kick start his International motorsport career on the right foot.

During 2013 Team Kiwi Racing campaigned for a second season in the Australian Porsche Carrera Cup Championship. This time TKR Owner David John allocated the drive to Shae Davies and Adam Gowans. Both drivers were quick and achieved solid results for TKR in their respective categories highlighted by Team Kiwi Racing winning the Porsche Carrera Cup Rennsport meeting followed by three wins from three starts for TKR at Bathurst, Mount Panorama with Adam Gowans driving.

For 2014 Team Kiwi Racing purchased a NZV8 for Craig Baird to race. The season started well with Pole positions and race wins but a tough season eventuated with the older Holden engines being pushed to their limits and past them to keep up with the Ford falcon motorsport engines resulting in two engine failures that saw a tough season for TKR.

For the 2016 season Team Kiwi Racing dipped their toe in the water to experience the NZ V8SuperTourer Championship. Craig Baird again provided TKR with race wins at Pukekohe Raceway and Taupo International raceway before it was decided that the politics between NZV8 Touring cars and V8SuperTourers needed to be sorted before making further commitments to either championship going forward.

In 2017 Thomas Boniface, a 13-year-old BMW MINI Challenge Driver is the latest young Kiwi driver to be selected as part of the TKR Development Academy. Boniface is a 4 times national Kart-Sport Champion and TKR have big plans for him moving forward. Boniface finished a season high of 5th at the Taupo round out of 32 cars.

In 2019 Team Kiwi Racing decided to enter the Bathurst 1000 as a Wildcard and purchased a Triple Eight built Holden ZB Commodore and lined up 2018 Porsche Carrera Cup Australia Champion Jaxon Evans and three-time Porsche Carrera Cup Asia Champion Chris van der Drift to drive the car. The team ended up scrapping there plans due to the lack of funding.

V8 Supercars drivers

  Jason Richards
  Angus Fogg
  Simon Wills
  Craig Baird
  Mark Porter
  Fabian Coulthard
  Paul Radisich
  Daniel Gaunt
  Adam Macrow
  Steve Owen
  Shane van Gisbergen
  John McIntyre
  Kayne Scott
  Chris Pither
  Fahad Al Musalam
  Dean Fiore

Complete Bathurst 1000 results

References

External links
 Team Kiwi Racing official website
 Team Kiwi aligns with Stone Brothers Racing

Supercars Championship teams
New Zealand auto racing teams
Auto racing teams established in 1999